Qarah Gonbad-e Olya (also Romanized as Qarah Gonbad-e ‘Olyā and Qareh Gonbad-e ‘Olyā) is a village in Charuymaq-e Sharqi Rural District, Shadian District, Charuymaq County, East Azerbaijan Province, Iran. At the 2006 census, its population was 120, in 16 families.

References 

Populated places in Charuymaq County